Dyer County Schools is the public school district for Dyer County, Tennessee. The district serves the entire county except for those served by the Dyersburg City Schools District.

Elementary schools
Fifth Consolidated School in Dyersburg  serving grades PK-5 (NCES Id )
Finley Elementary School in Finley  serving grades PK-5 (NCES Id )
Holice Powell Elementary School in Dyersburg  serving grades PK-5 (NCES Id )
Newbern Grammar in Newbern  serving grades PK-5 (NCES Id )
Trimble Elementary School in Trimble  serving grades PK-5 (NCES Id )

Middle schools
Three Oaks Middle School in Dyersburg  serving grades 6-8 (NCES Id )
Northview Middle School in Newbern  serving grades 6-8 (NCES Id )

High schools
Dyer County High School in Newbern  serving grades 9-12 (NCES Id )

References

Education in Dyer County, Tennessee
School districts in Tennessee